The Arch of Gallienus is a name given to the Porta Esquilina, an ancient Roman arch in the Servian Wall of Rome. It was here that the ancient Roman roads Via Labicana and Via Tiburtina started.

History 
The arch was rebuilt in monumental style in the Augustan period. It was not intended to be a triumphal arch but to serve as a gateway in the Republican city wall of Rome. In 262, the equestrian (Marcus) Aurelius Victor, member of the imperial household, rededicated the arch to the emperor Gallienus and his wife, Salonina, by replacing the original inscription. The purpose of the rededication was to balance the negative publicity which Gallienus had earned due to the various setbacks the Empire had suffered during his reign.

Site
It still stands in the Via San Vito, the ancient Clivus Suburanus – the sequel, the Via S. Martino ai Monti, follows the course of the ancient Argiletum, the main road to the Roman Forum.

Already in the Augustan period the Porta Esquilina was taken as included in the Esquiline Forum, which included the market called the Macellum Liviae.  When these buildings were abandoned in late antiquity, the diaconia and monastery of San Vito took them over, as recorded in the Einsiedeln Itinerary.  It is this church against which the arch's remains now rest.

Architecture
The surviving single arch is of travertine, 8.80 metres high, 7.30 wide, and 3.50 deep. It is supported by piers which are 1.40 metres wide and 3.50 deep. Outside these piers, there are two pilasters of the same depth, topped by Corinthian capitals. The pillars support a horizontal entablature which is 2 metres high and contains a dedicatory inscription on the architrave. There is a simple cornice on each side of the arch, beneath its spring. A drawing of the 15th century shows small side arches. These pedestrian arches were demolished during the 15th century.

Inscription

{|
|-
| valign = "top" |
|-
|GALLIENO CLEMENTISSIMO PRINCIPI 
|To Gallienus, the most clement princeps, 
|-
|CVIVS INVICTA VIRTVS SOLA PIETATE
|whose unconquered virtus is only outdone
|-
|SVPERACTA EST ET SALONINAE 
|by his pietas, and to Salonina,
|-
|SANCTISSIMAE AVGVSTAE AVRELIVS
|most holy Augusta, Aurelius
|-
|VICTOR V[ir] E[gregius] DICATISSIMVS 
|Victor, the excellent man, [dedicated this] in complete devotion
|-
|NVMINI MAIESTATIQVE EORVM  
|to their numina and majesty
|}

These two surviving lines represent the end of an inscription.  The large rectangular blank space above them had marble slabs fixed onto it, with the beginning of the inscription – the drilled holes for these slabs' metal fixings are still visible. The missing part of the inscription probably named the emperor Valerian, father of Gallienus who was captured by the Sassanid Persians in 260.

See also

List of Roman triumphal arches
List of ancient monuments in Rome

References

Sources
Corpus Inscriptiorum Latinarum VI.1106

External links

Gallienus